Paulin Voavy  (born 10 November 1987) is a Malagasy professional footballer who plays for Réunion Premier League side Saint-Pauloise FC and the Madagascar national team.

Career statistics

Scores and results list Madagascar's goal tally first, score column indicates score after each Voavy goal.

Honours
Évian TGFC
 Championnat National: 2009–10

Madagascar
Indian Ocean Island Games silver medal: 2007

Madagascar U20
COSAFA U-20 Challenge Cup: 2005

Individual
COSAFA Cup top scorer: 2007
Indian Ocean Island Games Top scorer: 2007
AFCON Qualifiers Best XI: 2019 Matchday 1
Knight Order of Madagascar: 2019

References

External links

francefootball.fr 
lfp.fr 

1987 births
Living people
People from Melaky
Malagasy footballers
Association football midfielders
Association football forwards
Madagascar international footballers
2019 Africa Cup of Nations players
Ligue 2 players
Algerian Ligue Professionnelle 1 players
Egyptian Premier League players
US Boulogne players
AS Cannes players
Misr Lel Makkasa SC players
Thonon Evian Grand Genève F.C. players
CS Constantine players
Ghazl El Mahalla SC players
Malagasy expatriate footballers
Malagasy expatriate sportspeople in France
Expatriate footballers in France
Expatriate footballers in Réunion
Malagasy expatriate sportspeople in Algeria
Expatriate footballers in Algeria
Malagasy expatriate sportspeople in Egypt
Expatriate footballers in Egypt
Recipients of orders, decorations, and medals of Madagascar